"Power" is a song by South Korean–Chinese boy band Exo, released on September 5, 2017, for the repackaged edition of their fourth studio album The War: The Power of Music. It was released in Korean and Chinese by their label SM Entertainment. On October 20, four remixes of the song were released through SM Station.

Background and release 
Produced by LDN Noise, "Power" is described as an EDM song featuring dynamic synthesizer sounds and drum beats. The lyrics talk about how one can become stronger through music that unites everyone into one. The song was released on September 5 together with the repackage album.

On October 18, it was revealed that four remix versions of the song by DJs R3hab, Dash Berlin, IMLAY and SHAUN will be released through SM Station on October 20. The remixes were digitally released on October 20.

Music video 
A teaser of "Power" music video was released on September 4, 2017. The Korean and Chinese music videos of "Power" were released on September 5. The music video begins with a narration explaining Exo's new world along with past released EXO songs, then turns into a video game–esque foreign planet where Exo members fight the Red Force machine (their opponent) to get the orbs of their superpowers back which were officially assigned to them early in their careers.  Macrograph, the local VFX studio responsible for visual effects in blockbuster films like "Roaring Currents" and "Northern Limit Line," handled the video's visual effects.

The Korean music video hit one million views in its first three hours of release and 6,605,588 in 24 hours. Ten days after its release, the music video hit one million likes. The Korean music video has over 90 million views on YouTube.

Promotion 

SM Entertainment began promoting the repackaged album and "Power" by releasing teasers with the message "The Power of Music". The first teaser titled #Total_Eclipse was released on August 21, 2017, at the same time as when the solar eclipse of August 21, 2017 happened. The second teaser was released on August 28 titled #Parallel_Universe. The third teaser titled "Power #RF_05" was released on August 30.

On the same day, the title of the repackaged album was revealed to be The War: The Power of Music and that it will be released on September 5, 2017, with 12 tracks including the title track "Power". SM started releasing teaser images of each member from August 30.

On September 6, Exo held a mini fan meeting where they performed "Power" for the first time. Exo began promoting "Power" on South Korean Music shows on September 7.

Reception

Commercial performance 
The song debuted at number two on Gaon Digital and Download Chart as well as number 3 on Billboard's US World Digital Songs.

On September 14, Exo's song "Power" recorded the highest score of all time on M Countdown with 11,000 points, making EXO the first artist to achieve a perfect score after the system changes were implemented in June 2015. The win also marked their 100th win on music shows.

The War: The Power of Music reached number one on iTunes in 41 countries in total, including in Spain, Japan, Indonesia, Russia, Hong Kong, Finland, Denmark, Poland, Mexico and Malaysia. The album also made it to the Top 10 on the iTunes charts in 67 countries, including in U.S., Canada, Australia, Britain, France and Germany. Additionally, the album topped the Xiami Music's K-Pop charts.

Dubai Fountain Show 
Exo's "Power" was chosen as the first Korean song to be played at the Dubai Fountain's repertoire. whose current music repertoire includes mega-hit songs from global artists such as "Thriller" by Michael Jackson, "I Will Always Love You" by Whitney Houston, "Skyfall" by Adele and many more.

Exo commented, "We are delighted to introduce global audiences to our song 'Power' at this world-famous site. It is a true honour for our song to have been chosen as the first ever K-pop to be played by The Dubai Fountain; not only is 'Power' a dynamic song, but the lyrics describe how music can make people stronger by uniting us all. This ties in with the very essence of The Dubai Fountain itself, a place where visitors from all around the world gather together in one spot to enjoy the truly spectacular fountain show". Before the premiere on January 18, 2018, Exo held a fan meeting and a press conference in Dubai.

Winter Olympics 
On February 25, Exo performed "Power" at the 2018 Winter Olympics closing ceremony at Pyeongchang Olympic Stadium in Pyeongchang, South Korea. The song's sales increased by 1,000 copies in the US and it returned to Billboard's World Digital Songs chart.

FIFA World Cup 2018 
On July 4, the official FIFA World Cup Twitter posted a tweet asking fans which song they would like heard inside the Luzhniki Stadium in Moscow. Exo's "Power" was among the options, and after a day of intense voting, the results were: EXO's “Power” to be played at the World Cup stadium. 'FIFA World Cup' announced EXO's "Power" were chosen to play on the day of the final match. The official Twitter account for the Olympics also showed their support for EXO and replied back to the World Cup tweet with a gif of EXO performing at the PyeongChang 2018.

Track listing

Charts

Weekly charts

Monthly chart

Sales

Accolades

Music program awards

Release history

References 

Exo songs
Korean-language songs
Chinese-language songs
2017 singles
2017 songs
SM Entertainment singles
Billboard Korea K-Pop number-one singles